The Jean Coutu Group (PJC) Inc. is a Canadian drugstore chain headquartered in Varennes, Quebec. It has more than 400 franchised locations in New Brunswick, Ontario and Quebec under the PJC Jean Coutu, PJC Clinique, and PJC Santé banners.  The company was once the third largest distributor and retailer of pharmaceuticals and related products in North America, with nearly 2,200 drug stores. Its American stores have been sold to Rite Aid.

The company is also known for its private line "Personnelle", which produces a wide variety of products such as cosmetics, papers, and pharmaceutical products. Since 2017, the main distribution warehouse is located in Varennes, Quebec (after Longueuil 1976-2015), though there is also a large distribution warehouse in Hawkesbury, Ontario, since 2005.

History
The company was co-founded in 1969 by Jean Coutu and Louis Michaud, as a pharmacy in the east end of Montreal.

The company became incorporated in 1973 under the name Services Farmico, enticed by the five branches already set up in Montreal. The name was changed 13 years later to its current name, the Jean Coutu Group (PJC) Inc., and was put on the stock exchange. In 1982 it entered the New Brunswick market and then the Ontario market in 1983. Beginning in 1987, the company began a series of acquisitions that continues. Over the past 20 years, the Jean Coutu Group has acquired Cadieux drugstores, twelve Cloutier Pharmacy outlets, sixteen Douglas Drug Inc. outlets, 221 outlets of the Brooks Drug Store, Rite Aid drugstores, retail properties, eight Mayrand drugstores, 19 Cumberland stores, and many more in the United States. The Jean Coutu Group was the first in Canada to set up an online service that allows customers to refill their prescriptions, then a year later expanded this concept by having the same system but that could be done over the telephone. Some of the titles this corporation has earned include "Canada’s Most Respected Corporations", and "The Most Admired Company in Quebec", which it has won seven times.

With the majority of its franchises in Quebec, it is the province from which it receives most of its revenue, although it has also gotten a great deal of profit from the United States. The main competition are Loblaws and Shoppers Drug Mart, Wal-Mart, Familiprix, Brunet, and Uniprix.

Since the end of the 1980s, the corporation has merged and acquired much of its competition. It has become one of the leading companies in Quebec and has been growing throughout the other provinces and into the United States because of its successful integration of acquisitions. There are many different trademarks and they are continuously increasing due to these mergers. Jean Coutu is a public company and is listed under PJC.A.TO. on the Toronto Stock Exchange.

In May 2013, Jean Coutu announced that it would move its head office from Longueuil to Varennes, because the present head office is too small. At a cost of $190 million, the new building will be near Autoroute 30 and it will be ready for 2016.

In September 2017, Jean Coutu announced it was in talks to be acquired by Metro Inc, a Canadian supermarket chain, for approximately C$4.50bn.   The deal closed in May 2018.

Jean Coutu Group USA
Coutu's U.S. subsidiary, Warwick, Rhode Island-based Jean Coutu Group (PJC) USA Inc., operated primarily along the east coast, under the Brooks Pharmacy banner in New England and Eckerd Pharmacy from Upstate New York and Pennsylvania south to Georgia.  The U.S. operations were sold off in a deal with Rite Aid. Coutu had purchased Brooks in 1994 from the now-defunct Revco drug chain. (Revco had acquired Brooks a few months earlier as part of its acquisition of Hook's-SupeRx, Inc, once a large operator of several pharmacy chains.)

In mid-2004, Coutu acquired more than half of the Eckerd store network (mainly units along the eastern seaboard) from department store retailer J.C. Penney.  It continued to operate those stores under the Eckerd name. (The remainder of Eckerd's stores were sold to CVS Pharmacy.) From 1999 to 2004 the chain was the second fastest-growing retailer in the world. In the second quarter of 2005, the company recorded a $19.7 million US foreign exchange loss on items related to the Eckerd acquisition. On August 24, 2006, Rite Aid announced that it would acquire 1,858 Jean Coutu's Eckerd and Brooks U.S. operations for $1.45bn in cash and issuing stock, giving Jean Coutu a 32% equity stake in Rite Aid. Rite Aid announced the acquisition completed on June 4, 2007.

In July 2013, Coutu proceeded to the sale of its last shares of Rite Aid that it held. Jean Coutu no longer holds any shares of Rite Aid.

Jean Coutu Controversies 

In August 2022 a Quebec pharmacist made headlines by pharmacist refusing to sell a customer emergency oral contraception, better known as the morning-after pill, because it went against his religious beliefs.

Main competitors

Shoppers Drug Mart (Pharmaprix in Quebec)
Familiprix
Uniprix
Proxim

References

External links
  Official Jean Coutu Group website

Canadian pharmacy brands
Franchises
Companies based in Longueuil
Retail companies established in 1969
1969 establishments in Quebec
Companies formerly listed on the Toronto Stock Exchange
2018 mergers and acquisitions
Metro Inc.